

Walter Lehweß-Litzmann (5 June 1907 – 16 September 1986) was a Major in the Luftwaffe during World War II, and recipient of the Knight's Cross of the Iron Cross. After the war he served in the National People's Army of the German Democratic Republic and worked for the East German airline Interflug.

Awards and decorations

 German Cross in Gold on 16 September 1942 as Oberstleutnant im Generalstab of Luftflotte 5
 Knight's Cross of the Iron Cross on 29 October 1943 as Oberstleutnant and Geschwaderkommodore of Kampfgeschwader 3.

References

Citations

Bibliography

External links
Lehweß-Litzmann

1907 births
1986 deaths
Luftwaffe pilots
German World War II pilots
Recipients of the Gold German Cross
Recipients of the Knight's Cross of the Iron Cross
National People's Army personnel
Interflug